Larry John Pashnick (born April 25, 1956) is an American former baseball pitcher. Pashnick, a right-hander, played three seasons in Major League Baseball (MLB) from 1982 to 1984, posting a career won–loss record of 7–8 and a 4.17 earned run average (ERA).

After attending Michigan State University, Pashnick signed with the Detroit Tigers in 1979 as an amateur free agent and made his MLB debut with the Tigers in 1982. That year, he went 4–4 in 28 appearances, including 13 starts, and had a 4.01 ERA. In 1983, Pashnick compiled a 1–3 record in 12 games, including six starts, and his ERA jumped to 5.26. During the 1983 off-season, the Tigers traded him to the Minnesota Twins for outfielder Rusty Kuntz. Pitching primarily as a reliever in Minnesota, Pashnick had a 2–1 record and a 3.52 ERA in 1984, his last season in MLB.

Sources

External links
, or Retrosheet, or Pura Pelota

1956 births
American expatriate baseball players in Venezuela
Baseball players from Michigan
Detroit Tigers players
Evansville Triplets players
Lakeland Tigers players
Living people
Major League Baseball pitchers
Michigan State Spartans baseball players
Minnesota Twins players
Montgomery Rebels players
People from Lincoln Park, Michigan
Tigres de Aragua players
Toledo Mud Hens players